Forest Heights could refer to:

Canada
 Forest Heights, Edmonton, Alberta
 Forest Heights, Ontario, a neighbourhood in Kitchener, Ontario
 Forest Heights Collegiate Institute, a high school in Kitchener, Ontario

United States
 Forest Heights (Knoxville, Tennessee)
 Forest Heights, Maryland
 Forest Heights Middle School, Little Rock, Arkansas
 Forest Heights Academy of Excellence, East Baton Rouge Parish, Louisiana
 Forest Heights, Texas